Princess of Glass is a 2010 fantasy novel written by Jessica Day George.  Similar to how its prequel, Princess of the Midnight Ball, is based on the Twelve Dancing Princesses, Princess of Glass is based on Cinderella.

Summary
A couple of years after being freed from the curse of the King Under Stone, who had forced her and her eleven sisters to dance, Princess Poppy of Westfalin finds herself participating in an exchange program where princes and princesses spend time in other countries in Ionia, in the hopes of bringing the nations closer. Poppy finds herself going to her late mother's home country of Breton, where she stays with relatives. Since the curse, Poppy has sworn off dancing forever, and attends balls only to play cards.

In Breton, Poppy soon befriends Prince Christian of the Danelaw.  In the midst of their budding relationship, Christian and a hapless maid named Ellen quickly become the targets of the Corley, a dangerous and vindictive creature who will stop at nothing to make sure her revenge is completed.

Characters
Princess Poppy: An outspoken and unconventional young lady, Poppy is one of the middle sisters among the twelve princesses introduced in Princess of the Midnight Ball.  She maintains a tough exterior for the sake of others, but feels somewhat insecure without the presence of her sisters and is secretly haunted by nightmares of the King Under Stone.
Ellen Parker:  Formerly Eleanora Parke-Whittington, Ellen is a maid who seems to be cursed with an unusual amount of ineptness since the loss of her family after their fortunes collapsed.  Because of her clumsiness, Ellen has been passed through a number of employers until she is placed in the service of the Seadowns' household.  Unable to see past her own pride, she quickly becomes the target of the Corley, who claims to be Ellen's godmother, and promises to deliver her from her miserable life of servitude by marrying her off to a Dane prince.  She attends balls under the alias "Lady Ella."
Prince Christian: The Prince of the Danelaw, a good-hearted and friendly young man sent to stay with the Bretoner royal family.  He develops a romantic interest in Poppy, but becomes the Corley's target for marrying off her goddaughter, the Lady Ella.
The Corley: A malevolent witch who uses glass as part of her spells.  While she appears jovial and benevolent, she intends to use Ellen and Christian to fulfill her revenge from long ago that involved the death of her true goddaughter after she fell in love with a Dane prince.
Roger Thwaite: A sophisticated and serious young man who has recently returned from the Far East.  As the rest of their friends fall under the Corley's spell, Poppy and Roger must use their limited knowledge of magic to save their friends from the Corley.  He is a childhood sweetheart of Eleanora, and he and Ellen still reciprocate those feelings for one another.
Marianne Seadown: Poppy's second cousin, a cheerful and kindhearted young woman.  Unlike Poppy, she is sweet-natured and ladylike, but does not hesitate to support Poppy and her friends when needed.  However, when she falls under the Corley's spell, she becomes unusually vindictive whenever Lady Ella is brought up.
Dickon Thwaite: Roger's younger brother and Marianne's sweetheart.  He is a friendly and affable young man, though less sophisticated than his older brother.  He falls under the Corley's spell and quickly becomes infatuated with Lady Ella, along with many other men.
Lady Margaret Seadown: Marianne's mother and the elegant cousin of Poppy's mother, Maude, as well as a relative of King Rupert of Breton.  A gracious and beautiful woman, Lady Margaret warmly welcomes Poppy into her home and encourages Poppy to attend balls, despite Poppy's aversion to dancing.
Lord Richard Seadown: Marianne's father, a kind and generous man.  However, Poppy quickly realizes that Lord Richard is unusually reluctant to win at cards and is strangely immune to the spells of the Corley.  As Poppy and her friends eventually learn, he knows more about the Corley and Eleanora's circumstances than anyone realizes.

See also
Cinderella
Princess of the Midnight Ball

External links
 Princess of Glass at the author's website

2010 American novels
2010 fantasy novels
Works based on Cinderella
Young adult fantasy novels
American fantasy novels
Novels based on fairy tales
American young adult novels
Novels by Jessica Day George
Bloomsbury Publishing books
Books about princesses